Phillip Scifleet, born 4 May 1977, is an Australian race driver. Starting in Karts in 1993 winning the Australian Formula A Series in 1994 before moving up into the cars for the Australian Suzuki GTi Cup in 1995. Then he moved into Formula Ford in 1996, winning the New South Wales Championship. In 1997 he competed in the Australian Formula Ford Championship finishing tenth. From there he entered the British Formula Three Championship in Class B, but ran out of funds halfway through the season. He did so well at the start of the season that he could not be caught in points and won the championship. He took two years off racing and entered V8 Supercar in 2000, doing mainly long-distance races until 2004, when he entered the Konica Series.

Career results

Bathurst 1000 results

References 
 Speedsport 
 Conrod Bio 
 Doric Racing Bio 
 Cams National titles 

1977 births
Living people
Supercars Championship drivers
British Formula Three Championship drivers
Racing drivers from New South Wales
Garry Rogers Motorsport drivers